Flight 410 may refer to:

Pennsylvania Central Airlines Flight 410, crashed on 13 June 1947
Avianca Flight 410, crashed on 17 March 1988

0410